The Philippine National Railways and its predecessors such as the Manila Railroad Company have operated several types of locomotives, carriages and multiple units as part of its fleet. As of 2022, the rolling stock used are primarily powered by diesel. The DOST Hybrid Electric Train may also function as a battery electric multiple unit although it is started by a diesel engine. All present rolling stock are built to the  narrow gauge.

In late 2019, all trains in service except the 203 series-derived coaches underwent refurbishment and livery changes. The multiple units were given an orange and white color scheme and its windows were changed from having steel grills to polycarbonate windows that can resist stoning from illegal settlers while the locomotives have been painted orange.

In 2022, PNR introduced their first ever standard gauge EMU that will run through the North-South commuter rail or NSCR. The rolling stock are still unclassified

Active 

Locomotives

Coaches

Multiple units

Future

Locomotives

Multiple units

Notes

Retired 
As one of the oldest rail operators in Asia, the Philippine National Railways and its predecessors, the Manila Railway and Manila Railroad companies, had a diverse collection of steam and diesel locomotives, passenger railcars, gasoline, and diesel multiple units. All but three tank locomotives from the Manila Railway were scrapped.

Former locomotives 
According to a 1952 publication, the Second World War destroyed 120 locomotives belonging to the Manila Railroad (MRR), more than 75% of its fleet.

Former coaches
Does not include freight stock since there is little documentation about their classification and numbers.

Former railmotors and multiple units

Non-revenue equipment

Notes

References 

Philippine National Railways
Rolling stock of the Philippines